This is a list of Albania international footballers who were born outside Albania. Players born in countries other than Albania including those born in diaspora may qualify for the Albania team through Albanian parents or grandparents, or through residency in Albania and subsequent naturalisation as Albanian citizens.

Key

List of players

By country of birth

References

External links
 Albania international footballers of all-time at EU-Football.info - National football teams of Europe
 Albania national football team at National-Football-Teams.com
 FSHF.org
 Albania national team at Soccerway

 
Albania
Lists of Albanian footballers
Association football player non-biographical articles
Albanian diaspora
Albania